Gawen is a masculine given name and a surname. It may refer to:

 Gawen Hamilton (1698–1737), Scottish painter
 Gawen Lawrie, English merchant and deputy governor of the American province of East Jersey from 1683 to 1686
 Gawen Bonzi Wells (born 1976), American former National Basketball Association player
 An old English spelling of Gawain - see The Wedding of Sir Gawain and Dame Ragnelle (The Weddynge of Syr Gawen and Dame Ragnell)
 John Gawen (died 1418), English Member of Parliament and lawyer

See also
 Gowen (disambiguation)

English-language masculine given names